Johan Engström (born 16 July 1976) is a Swedish professional darts player who competes in Professional Darts Corporation events.

Known as the "Sweet Ferret", Engström has made multiple appearances on the PDC European Tour via the Nordic & Baltic qualifiers, and made his debut for Sweden at the 2021 PDC World Cup of Darts alongside Daniel Larsson.

References

External links

1976 births
Living people
Professional Darts Corporation current tour card holders
People from Södertälje
Swedish darts players